José Juca de Oliveira Santos (born 16 March 1935) is a Brazilian actor.

Filmography

Film
1967: Case of the Naves Brothers - Sebastião Naves
1972: O Jogo da Vida e da Morte - Claudio
1977: À Flor da Pele - Marcelo
1982: Perdida Em Sodoma - Siqueira
1982: Deu Veado na Cabeça
1983: A Mulher, a Serpente e a Flor
1999: Other Stories
2001: Bufo & Spallanzani - Prof. Ceresso
2004: Onde Anda Você - Felício Barreto
2007: The Sign of the City - Aníbal
2016: De Onde Eu Te Vejo - Afonso

Soap operas

1964: Quando o Amor É Mais Forte (Tupi)
1964: Gutierritos, o Drama dos Humildes (Tupi) - Jorge
1965: O Cara Suja (Tupi) - Valdemar
1965: A Outra (Tupi) - Vicente
1966: A Inimiga (Tupi) - Maurício
1966: A Ré Misteriosa (Tupi) - Sílvio
1967: Angústia de Amar (Tupi) - Ronald
1967: Paixão Proibida (Tupi)
1967: Estrelas no Chão (Tupi) - Horácio
1968: O Homem que Sonhava Colorido (Tupi)
1969: Nino, o Italianinho (Tupi) - Nino
1971: A Fábrica (Tupi) - Fábio
1972: Camomila e Bem-me-Quer (Tupi) - Bruno
1973: O Semideus (Globo) - Alberto Parreiras
1974: Fogo sobre Terra (Rede Globo) - Pedro Azulão
1976: Saramandaia (Rede Globo) - João Gibão
1977: Espelho Mágico (Rede Globo) - Jordão Amaral
1978: Pecado Rasgado (Rede Globo) - Renato
1982: Ninho da Serpente (Bandeirantes) - Dr. Almeida Prado
1983: Parabéns pra Você (Rede Globo) - Volber
1990: Brasileiras e Brasileiros (SBT)
1993: Fera Ferida (Rede Globo) - Professor Praxedes
1995: As Pupilas do Senhor Reitor (SBT) - Father Antônio
1995: A Idade da Loba (Bandeirantes) - Jordão
1997: Os Ossos do Barão (SBT) - Egisto Ghirotto
1998: Torre de Babel (Rede Globo) - Agenor da Silva
2000 Vidas Cruzadas (Record) - Aquiles
2001: O Clone (Rede Globo) - Augusto Albieri
2005: Mad Maria (Rede Globo, miniseries) - Stephan Collier
2007: Amazônia, de Galvez a Chico Mendes (Rede Globo) - José de Carvalho
2008: Queridos Amigos (Rede Globo, minissérie) - Alberto
2011: Araguaia (Globo) - Gabriel
2012: Avenida Brasil (Rede Globo) - Santiago
2013: Flor do Caribe (Rede Globo) - Samuel
2017: O Outro Lado do Paraíso - Natanael Mello
2015: Os Experientes - Napoleão Roberto Junqueira da Costa

External links

1935 births
People from Itapira
Oliveira, Juca da
Brazilian male telenovela actors
Living people